Rivet Head Culture is a various artists compilation album released on May 30, 1993 by If It Moves....

Reception
A critic at Sonic Boom praised the Rivet Head Culture compilation, saying "it amazes me that bands like A-Politiq, Death Method and M.A.S. still remain hidden from record labels" and "Chase has done the entire industrial music industry a huge favor by digging through the mountains of demo tapes he receives for some of the best unsigned talent in the industry."

Track listing

Personnel
Adapted from the Rivet Head Culture liner notes.

 Chase – compiling, design, typesetting
 John Gire – illustrations
 Trevor Henthorn – mastering
 Kristin Martin – typesetting
 Paulkun Noy – design

Release history

References

External links 
 Rivet Head Culture at Discogs (list of releases)

1993 compilation albums
Electro-industrial compilation albums
Re-Constriction Records compilation albums